George Mira Jr. (born c. 1965) is a former All-American middle linebacker for the University of Miami Hurricanes football team during the mid-1980s, taking over the reins after the departure of Jay Brophy. He is also the son of former U.M quarterback George Mira Sr. He had a stellar career at the University of Miami until the 1987 National Championship Game, his last game of his senior year, before which he was suspended by the NCAA for diuretics use. The suspension endangered his draft status, which sent him down to the 12th round of the 1988 NFL Draft, where he was selected by the San Francisco 49ers, but did not manage to play in a single NFL game.

He is now a retired division chief for MDFR.

References

External links
 1988 NFL Draft

American football middle linebackers
Miami Hurricanes football players
San Francisco 49ers players
Living people
Doping cases in American football
1960s births
Place of birth missing (living people)